Phyllodesma americana, the American lappet moth, is a moth of the  family Lasiocampidae. It is found from Nova Scotia to [northern Florida], west through Texas to California, north to British Columbia and Yukon.

The wingspan is 29–49 mm. Adults are on wing from March to September in two generations in the south. In eastern Ontario, adults are on wing from May to July. The flight season in Ohio is from April to August. There is one generation per year in the northern part of the range.

The larvae feed on the leaves of Alnus, Betula, Quercus, Populus, Salix, Ceanothus velutinus, Chrysolepis chrysophylla and Rosoideae species.

Subspecies
Phyllodesma americana rockiesensis
Phyllodesma americana borealis
Phyllodesma americana alascensis
Phyllodesma americana californica
Phyllodesma americana dyari
Phyllodesma americana celsivolans

External links
Bug Guide
Images
Moths of North Dakota

Lasiocampidae
Fauna of the California chaparral and woodlands
Moths described in 1841
Moths of North America